Eukaryotic translation initiation factor 3 subunit C (eIF3c) is a protein that in humans is encoded by the EIF3C gene.

Interactions 

EIF3C has been shown to interact with EIF3G and EIF3A.

See also 
Eukaryotic initiation factor 3 (eIF3)

References

Further reading